The rufous-cheeked tanager (Tangara rufigenis) is a species of bird in the family Thraupidae, the tanagers.
It is endemic to Venezuela. Its natural habitat is subtropical or tropical moist montane forests.

References

External links
Photo-Thumbnail

rufous-cheeked tanager
Birds of the Venezuelan Coastal Range
Endemic birds of Venezuela
rufous-cheeked tanager
rufous-cheeked tanager
Taxonomy articles created by Polbot